Da'an is a township in Longshan County, in the north west Hunan province of China.

References

Townships of Hunan
Longshan County